The Yale Whiffenpoofs is a collegiate a cappella singing group. Established at Yale University in 1909, it is the oldest such group in the United States. The line-up is completely replaced each year: the group is always composed of rising seniors, who often take a year leave of absence from the university to tour the United States and internationally. Former members include Cole Porter and Jonathan Coulton.

Name

According to Whiffenpoof historian James M. Howard:

History and activities
Established in 1909 and best known for "The Whiffenpoof Song", the group is composed of senior students who compete in the spring of their junior year for 14 spots. The Whiffenpoofs' best-known alumnus may be Cole Porter, who sang in the 1913 line-up; the group often performs Porter songs in tribute.

The Whiffenpoofs have performed for generations at a number of venues, including Lincoln Center, the White House, the Salt Lake Tabernacle, Oakland Coliseum, Carnegie Hall and the Rose Bowl. The group has appeared on such television shows as Jeopardy!, The Today Show, Saturday Night Live, 60 Minutes, Gilmore Girls, The West Wing, and Glee. In December 2010, the group appeared on NBC's a cappella competition The Sing-Off; they were eliminated fourth, on the second show.

During the school year, the Whiffenpoofs perform on Monday nights at Mory's, known more formally as Mory's Temple Bar, circulating from room to room.

The Whiffenpoofs travel extensively during the school year and take a three-month world tour during the summer. The group's business manager and musical director, known in Whiffenpoof tradition respectively as the "Popocatepetl" and "Pitchpipe," are chosen by members of the previous year's group. An alumni organization maintains close ties with the group.

Female membership 

Women matriculated at Yale beginning in 1969, and votes on the subject of admitting women to the Whiffenpoofs took place starting in the 1970s. Each vote denied female singers the opportunity to join the group. Women were allowed "show" auditions but were never "tapped" (chosen) for the group. As recently as November 20, 2016 the group voted against admitting women. A record number of women turned out for the 2017 auditions.

In a joint statement with their sister group, Whim 'n Rhythm, in early February 2018, the Whiffenpoofs announced that students of all genders would be eligible to audition. Later in that same month, the group accepted its first female member, Sofía Campoamor. The following year, the group accepted its second female member and first woman of color, Neha Bhatt. In February 2021, the Whiffenpoofs selected their first non-male leadership, Syd Bakal, as business manager for the '22 Whiffenpoofs.

"The Whiffenpoof Song" 

"The Whiffenpoof Song", the group's traditional closing number, is a four part male-voice choral song (TTBar.B) and was published in sheet music form in 1909. For the lyric Meade Minnigerode (Yale 1910) and George S. Pomeroy (Yale 1910) adapted Rudyard Kipling's poem "Gentlemen-Rankers". The poem had already been set to music by Tod B. Galloway (Amherst, 1885) and the sheet music copyrighted in 1909 and 1918 and again in 1936.

In the lyrics, "Mory's" refers to Mory's Temple Bar, a restaurant next to the campus and especially hospitable to Yale undergraduates (it allowed them credit), and "Louie" to its owner (1898–1912), Louis Linder.  "Shall I Wasting" is shorthand for "Shall I Wasting in Despair", and "Mavourneen" stands for "Kathleen Mavourneen", both popular part-songs in the Victorian era.

In popular culture 

The song has been covered many times. It became a hit for Rudy Vallée in 1937 and in 1947 for Bing Crosby, credited to Bing Crosby with Fred Waring and The Glee Club (Decca 73940). It has also been recorded by Elvis Presley, Count Basie, Perry Como, Ray Conniff, Mitch Miller, the Ames Brothers, the Statler Brothers, and countless others.

The chorus, as sung by flyers and crews of the U.S. Army Air Forces' daylight bombing effort during World War II, played a key role in the 1949 movie 12 O'Clock High. It is heard first in the background when Harvey Stovall (Dean Jagger) surveys the abandoned Archbury airfield in 1949, just before his flashback to 1942 begins. The men sing it quietly in the Officer's Club after the unit receives its first commendation, baffling Stovall and General Savage (Gregory Peck) with their subdued reaction: “They aren't celebrating the way kids ought to…” At the end of the film, when Stovall returns to the present, the refrain of “Don't Sit Under the Apple Tree” transitions with a flourish of trumpets to the remembered voices singing “We're poor kittle lambs.. “ which becomes a triumphant instrumental phrase and fanfare over “The End.”

It was used in the 1952 comedy film Monkey Business. When the tune comes on the radio, Cary Grant starts singing it to Marilyn Monroe, who declares it "a silly song". Later, Ginger Rogers sings it to Grant and describes it as "our song". And later still, Grant sings it to Rogers when he is locked out of the hotel room.

In the 1952 film Road to Bali from Paramount Pictures, starring Bob Hope, Bing Crosby and Dorothy Lamour, there is a scene in the beginning where Hope and Crosby find themselves in front of a herd of sheep. They sing the first part of the song's chorus with the special effect sheep "choir" adding the ending "Baa!, Baa!, Baa!" Crosby remarks, "That was helpful, wasn't it?" and Hope retorts, "Fred Waring must have played through here", referring to Bing's hit single of the tune, which was backed by Waring and his Glee Club.

The melody is the opening theme of the 1975 television series Baa Baa Black Sheep, a fictionalization of the World War II wartime exploits of the United States Marine Corps Marine Fighter Squadron VMF-214, ancestor of the Corps's present-day VMA-214 "Black Sheep" Squadron. "The Whiffenpoof Song" has long been associated with the VMA-214. One of the squadron's members, Paul "Moon" Mullen, adapted "The Whiffenpoof Song" for the squadron's use.  The squadron's badge features a gamboling black lamb that refers back to the song.

The Whiffenpoofs can be heard singing it in the 2006 movie The Good Shepherd, in the scene where Matt Damon's son tells him he wants to join the CIA.

In the play Serenading Louie by Lanford Wilson, performed at the Donmar Warehouse in London in 2010, the song is sung by the cast and by Bing Crosby.

During the song "Together Again" in the musical version of Young Frankenstein, Frederick Frankenstein confesses to Igor that he "was in fact the Whiffenpoof at Yale", which impresses Igor.

In The Simpsons episode "The Caper Chase", the Whiffenpoofs perform the song to Montgomery Burns, who offers the college a new library if he will have them killed.

Variations

Musical satirist Tom Lehrer spoofed "The Whiffenpoof Song" as part of his song "Bright College Days."  Lehrer, an instructor at Yale's traditional rival Harvard University, sings of "glasses raised on high" (at which point he removes his eyeglasses and holds them up) and of drinking a toast "to those we love the best", to rhyme with "we'll pass [which may mean 'pass the final exams' or 'die'] and be forgotten with the rest." He also sings "to the tables down at Mory's, wherever that may be...", evoking a laugh from the Harvard auditorium crowd at the live recording.

In 1973, the Harvard Krokodiloes debuted a spoof, "The Krokenpoof Song", with Harvard-specific lyrics, tongue-in-cheek references, bawdy variations involving references to Whiffenpoofs and sheep, rhymes such as "We'll drink lemonade Drambuie" in place of "We will serenade our Louis", and ending with "Baa, baa, humbug!"

Mad produced parody lyrics of it that were reprinted in the 1973 book The Mad Sampler. Titled "The Hundred-Proofs Song", it suggested that rich students forgot about their studies and resorted to getting drunk at the bar, "...earning the grades we deserve, we know; – F – F – F!"

Louis Armstrong recorded a satirical version of the song, subtitled (or maybe alternatively titled) "The Boppenpoof Song", poking fun at the bebop movement in jazz. His friend Rudy Vallée contributed lyrics to that version.

The introduction and a parody of the first verse are sung by Betty Grable during the graduation scene in How to Be Very, Very Popular (1955).

A parody of the chorus was included in the Two Ronnies' barbershop sketch in 1978.

The song serves as the basis for the University of Montevallo's Purple Side song, which is part of the College Night homecoming tradition.

Emblem
The group adopted the Whiffenpoof emblem in 1912. Depicting a heraldic wyvern with mint leaves for wings, a horse's neck, and a swizzle stick for a perch, it was designed by a cartoonist from campus humor magazine The Yale Record.

Notable members
Christophe Beck, television and film composer
Prescott Bush, U.S. Senator, father of President George H. W. Bush and grandfather of President George W. Bush
Jonathan Coulton, singer-songwriter
C. William Harwood, conductor
Charles Kullman, operatic tenor
Emil Henry, CEO Henry Tiger LLC, U.S. Assistant Secretary of the Treasury
Peter Peltz, artist
Cole Porter, composer, songwriter
Charles Rivkin, U.S. Assistant Secretary of State for Economic and Business Affairs
John Stewart, operatic tenor
Josh Singer, Oscar-winning screenwriter
Ron Livingston, actor

See also
The Whiffenpoof Song at Wikisource

References

External links

Whiffenpoofs Official Site

Collegiate a cappella groups
Yale University musical groups
Musical groups established in 1909
1909 establishments in Connecticut